Dikilitaş (former Enehil) is a small belde (town) in the central district (Niğde) of Niğde Province, Turkey. The population of the town is 1019 as of 2011  The former population of Dikilitaş was composed of Karamanlides and Moslem Turks. (Karamanlides was a Turkish-speaking Orthodox Christian community.) According to Ottoman documents, there were 200 Karamanlides and 80 Moslem Turkish families. In 1924, as result of Population exchange between Greece and Turkey agreement Karamanlides were replaced by Moslem Turks from Greece.

References

Niğde Province
Towns in Turkey
Niğde Central District